The 2014 DRIVE4COPD 300 was the first stock car race of the 2014 NASCAR Nationwide Series season, and the 33rd iteration of the event. The race was held on Saturday, February 22, 2014, in Daytona Beach, Florida at Daytona International Speedway, a 2.5 miles (4.0 km) permanent asphalt quad-oval superspeedway. The race was extended from 120 laps to 121 laps, due to a NASCAR overtime finish. At race's end, Regan Smith, driving for JR Motorsports, would hold off Brad Keselowski in a photo finish for his 4th career NASCAR Nationwide Series win. Smith would beat Keselowski by 0.013 second. To fill out the podium, Trevor Bayne of Roush Fenway Racing would finish third, respectively.

Background 

The race was held at Daytona International Speedway, which is a race track in Daytona Beach, Florida, United States. Since opening in 1959, it has been the home of the Daytona 500, the most prestigious race in NASCAR as well as its season opening event. In addition to NASCAR, the track also hosts races of ARCA, AMA Superbike, IMSA, SCCA, and Motocross. The track's  infield includes the  Lake Lloyd, which has hosted powerboat racing. The speedway is operated by NASCAR pursuant to a lease with the City of Daytona Beach on the property that runs until 2054.

Entry list 

 (R) denotes rookie driver.
 (i) denotes driver who is ineligible for series driver points.

Practice

First practice 
The first practice session was held on Thursday, February 20, at 12:00 PM EST, and would last for 85 minutes.

Second and final practice 
The third and final practice session, sometimes referred to as Happy Hour, was held on Thursday, February 20, at 3:00 PM EST, and would last for 85 minutes.

Qualifying 
Qualifying was held on Friday, February 21, at 1:10 PM EST. Since Daytona International Speedway is at least , the qualifying system was a multi-car system that included three rounds. The first round was 25 minutes, where every driver would be able to set a lap within the 25 minutes. Then, the second round would consist of the fastest 24 cars in Round 1, and drivers would have 10 minutes to set a lap. Round 3 consisted of the fastest 12 drivers from Round 2, and the drivers would have 5 minutes to set a time. Whoever was fastest in Round 3 would win the pole.

Qualifying was cancelled after the first round, due to inclement weather.

Nine drivers would fail to qualify: David Ragan, Tanner Berryhill, Chris Buescher, Willie Allen, Matt Carter, Matt DiBenedetto, Carl Long, Carlos Contreras, and Clay Greenfield.

Full qualifying results

Race results

Standings after the race 

Drivers' Championship standings

Note: Only the first 10 positions are included for the driver standings.

References 

NASCAR races at Daytona International Speedway
2014 in sports in Florida
February 2014 sports events in the United States
2014 NASCAR Nationwide Series